The United States Second Revenue Act of 1940 created a corporate excess profits tax (top rate 50%) and increased corporate tax rates (top rate from 33% to 35%).

Tax on corporations

Normal tax 

A Normal Tax was levied on the net income of corporations as shown in the following table.

Excess Profits Tax 
A Excess Profits Tax was levied on the excess profits net income (i.e., net income less allowances and exemptions) of corporations as shown in the following table.

 An exemption of $5,000 is allowed, and also an "excess profits credit" and "unused excess profits credit."

References

United States federal taxation legislation

1940 in American law
76th United States Congress
United States federal legislation articles without infoboxes